Robert Carl Bacchus (July 31, 1904 – March 2, 1985) was an American football player.  

Bacchus was born in Pine Bluff, Arkansas, in 1904. He played at the end position in the National Football League for the 1927 Cleveland Bulldogs and the 1928 Detroit Wolverines. He also played college football at the University of Missouri where he was selected by the Associated Press as a third-team player on the 1926 College Football All-America Team.

During World War II, Bacchus served in the Army Air Forces and received a Bronze Star.

Bacchus moved to Kansas City, Missouri, as a boy and lived there for the rest of his life. He was married in 1935 to Mildred Matthew. He worked from approximately 1945 to 1970 for the Kansas City Life Insurance Co.; he finished as the company's vice president and director of real estate and city loans.

References

1904 births
1972 deaths
Sportspeople from Pine Bluff, Arkansas
American football ends
Missouri Tigers football players
Cleveland Bulldogs players
Detroit Wolverines (NFL) players
Players of American football from Arkansas